Esiẹ is a town in Kwara State in Nigeria.

History

The town was founded by prince Baragbon c. 1770. The dialect of Yoruba spoken in Esie is predominantly Igbonna. The town has a king who is Oba Yakubu Babalola Egunjobi II.

Attractions

It is home to the Esiẹ Museum which was the first museum to be established in Nigeria.

Populated places in Kwara State
Towns in Yorubaland